The 2023 Imo State gubernatorial election will take place on 11 November 2023 due to the belated inauguration of incumbent Governor Hope Uzodinma, to elect the Governor of Imo State. Incumbent APC Governor Hope Uzodinma is eligible to run for re-election, but has not yet stated whether he will do so. The primaries are scheduled for between 27 March and 17 April 2022.

Electoral system
The Governor of Imo State is elected using a modified two-round system. To be elected in the first round, a candidate must receive the plurality of the vote and over 25% of the vote in at least two-thirds of state local government areas. If no candidate passes this threshold, a second round will be held between the top candidate and the next candidate to have received a plurality of votes in the highest number of local government areas.

Primary elections
The primaries, along with any potential challenges to primary results, will take place between 27 March and 17 April 2022.

All Progressives Congress

Potential 
 Ifeanyi Ararume: former Senator for Imo North
 Jude Ejiogu: former Secretary to Imo State Government and 2019 APC gubernatorial candidate
 David Mbamara: entrepreneur
 Chukwuemeka Nwajiuba: former Minister of State for Education (2019–2022) and former House of Representatives member for Ehime Mbano/Ihitte Uboma/Obowo
 Uche Nwosu: 2019 APC gubernatorial candidate and AA gubernatorial nominee, Governor Okorocha administration official, and son-in-law of former Governor Okorocha
 Hope Uzodinma: Governor and former Senator for Imo West

People's Democratic Party 
In late 2022 and early 2023, reporting revealed an intense internal battle within the Imo PDP over the gubernatorial ticket between the state party's two most influential figures: former Senator Samuel Anyanwu and former Governor Emeka Ihedioha. Anyanwu and Ihedioha had competed for the 2019 nomination and struggled for control of the state party during the 2022 legislative primaries. In January 2023, observers noted PDP concern that the Anyanwu-Ihedioha feud could hurt the party ahead of elections in both February and October.

Expressed interest 
 Emeka Ihedioha: former Governor and former House of Representatives member for Aboh Mbaise/Ngor Okpala

Potential 
 Samuel Anyanwu: PDP National Secretary, former Senator for Imo East, and 2019 PDP gubernatorial candidate
 Jerry Alagbaoso: House of Representatives member for Oru East/Orsu/Orlu

Conduct

Electoral timetable 
On 25 October 2022, the Independent National Electoral Commission released the timetable, setting out key dates and deadlines for the election.

 14 November 2022 – Publication of Notice of Election
 27 March 2023 – First day for the conduct of party primaries
 17 April 2023 – Final day for the conduct of party primaries, including the resolution of disputes arising from them
 24 April 2023 – First day for submission of nomination forms to INEC via the online portal
 5 May 2023 – Final day for submission of nomination forms to INEC via the online portal
 9 June 2023 – Publication of final nominee list
 14 June 2023 – Commencement of the official campaign period
 9 November 2023 – Final day of the official campaign period

General election

Results

By senatorial district 
The results of the election by senatorial district.

By federal constituency
The results of the election by federal constituency.

By local government area 
The results of the election by local government area.

References 

Imo State gubernatorial election
2023
Imo